Mesometridae is a family of trematodes belonging to the order Plagiorchiida.

Genera:
 Centroderma Lühe, 1901
 Elstia Bray, 1984
 Mesometra Lühe, 1901
 Neowardula Al-Jahdali, 2010
 Parawardula Jones & Blair, 2005
 Wardula Poche, 1926

References

Plagiorchiida